The Park Country Club of Buffalo, Inc. is a country club located in the Town of Amherst, just outside Williamsville, New York, a suburb of Buffalo, United States. The club was founded in 1903 in the City of Buffalo in what is now known as Delaware Park, but which was known simply as The Park at the time. The Park Club hosted the 1934 PGA Championship.

Facilities
Lounges and meeting rooms are available to the members and their guests, in addition to formal, informal, and patio dining and dancing. Other leisure facilities include tennis, volleyball, swimming and diving, and lawn bowling, as well as a golf course designed by Colt & Alison.

Clubhouse
The club moved out of the city to its current location on Ellicott Creek in 1928. The current clubhouse was designed by noted architect Clifford C. Wendehack and was originally decorated by George Hoag of Prentiss & Company. The clubhouse is a built of "brick and stone of many varieties, French fossil and Jeanne d’Arc having been blended with Holland brick," according to contemporary newspaper reports. The clubhouse has since been expanded, including kitchen facilities and lounge and locker rooms, in consistent English Gothic and Tudor style.

PGA Championship
In 1934 the golf course was the venue for the PGA Championship, one of professional golf's four major championships. The tournament was won by Paul Runyan, who defeated Craig Wood in the final at the second extra hole.

References

External links

Tourist attractions in Buffalo, New York
Sports venues in Erie County, New York
Golf clubs and courses in New York (state)
Golf clubs and courses designed by Harry Colt
1903 establishments in New York (state)